The Balkan mole (Talpa stankovici) is a species of mammal in the family Talpidae. It is found in Montenegro, Albania, North Macedonia and Greece, including the island of Corfu.

References

Talpa
Mammals of Europe
Mammals described in 1931
Taxonomy articles created by Polbot